William Foulkes may refer to:

William Foulkes (priest) (died 1691), Welsh cleric
Bill Foulkes (1932–2013), English footballer
Billy Foulkes (1926–1979), Welsh footballer
William Foulkes (footballer, born 1863), Wales international footballer of the 1880s

See also
William Foulke (disambiguation)